Dos Porcos River may refer to either of two rivers in Brazil:

Dos Porcos River (Bahia), a river of Bahia state of eastern Brazil
Dos Porcos River (Santa Catarina), a river of Santa Catarina state in southeastern Brazil